Galehzan Rural District is a rural district (dehestan) in the Central District of Khomeyn County, Markazi Province, Iran. At the 2006 census, its population was 5,116, in 1,628 families. The rural district has 21 villages.

References 

Rural Districts of Markazi Province
Khomeyn County